Segue 1 is a dwarf spheroidal galaxy or globular cluster situated in the Leo constellation and discovered in 2006 by Sloan Digital Sky Survey. It is located at a distance of about 23 kpc (about 75,000 light years) from the Sun and moves away from the Sun with the velocity of about 206 km/s. Segue 1 has a noticeably elongated (ratio of axes ~ 2:1) shape with the half-light radius of about 30 pc. This elongation may be caused by the tidal forces acting from the Milky Way galaxy if Segue 1 is being tidally disrupted now.

The name is due to the fact that it was found by the SEGUE program, the Sloan Extension for Galactic Understanding and Exploration.

Properties
Segue 1 is one of the smallest and faintest satellites of the Milky Way—its integrated luminosity is about 300 times that of the Sun (absolute visible magnitude of about −1.5), which is much smaller than the luminosity of a typical globular cluster. Observations indicate its mass is about 600,000 solar masses, which means that Segue's 1 mass to light ratio is around 3400. Segue 1 had the highest known mass-to-light ratio of any observed galaxy as of 2011. A high mass to light ratio implies that Segue 1 may be dominated by dark matter. It is difficult, however, to estimate the mass of such faint objects due to significant foreground contamination, which inflates the velocity dispersion. In addition, any mass estimate is based on an implicit assumption that an object is gravitationally bound, which may not be true if the object is in a process of disruption.

The stellar population of Segue 1 consists mainly of old stars formed more than 12 billion years ago. Currently there is no star formation in Segue 1. Measurements have so far failed to detect neutral hydrogen in it—the upper limit is 13 solar masses. There is an estimate of roughly 1000 stars within the object. Of these, 7 have been found to be in the red giant stage of their life. The chemical composition of Segue 1 indicates no substantial chemical evolution has occurred since the galaxy formed, supporting the idea that it may be a surviving first galaxy that experienced only one burst of star formation, a fossil galaxy from the early universe.

Segue 1 is located in the middle of the Sagittarius Stream and at approximately the same distance from the Sun. It may once have been a globular cluster of the Sagittarius Dwarf Elliptical Galaxy, which was later stripped from it by the tidal forces acting from the Milky Way galaxy. However, more recent studies concluded that Segue 1 is not actually associated with the Sagittarius stream and that it is not being tidally disrupted. If Segue 1 is a galaxy it may have been a satellite of the Sagittarius Dwarf Elliptical Galaxy in the past.

Notes

References

External links

Local Group
Milky Way Subgroup
Dwarf spheroidal galaxies
Leo (constellation)
Globular clusters
?
4713559